Nandi may refer to:

People 
 Nandy (surname), Indian surname
 Nandi (mother of Shaka) (1760–1827), daughter of Bhebe of the Langeni tribe
 Onandi Lowe (born 1974), Jamaican footballer nicknamed Nandi
 Nandi Bushell (born 2010), South African-British drummer and musician
 Nandi Madida (born 1988), South African actress, musician and TV personality
Nandi Rose Plunkett, Indian-American musician
Nandi Thimmana, 16th-century Indian poet
Nandivarman II (718–796) Pallava ruler in India
Nandivarman III (r. 846–869), Pallava ruler in India
Nandi Yellaiah (1942–2020), Indian politician

Places 
Nandi, Belgaum, Karnataka, India
 Nandi, Queensland, Australia
 The old spelling for Nadi, Fiji
Nandi Bagan, neighbourhood in Kolkata in West Bengal, India
Nandi County (formerly Nandi District), Kenya
Nandi Firozpur, village in Uttar Pradesh, India
Nandi Hills (disambiguation)
Nandi Hills, India
Nandi Hills, Kenya
Nandi Temple (disambiguation)
Nandi Temple, Khajuraho India
Nandi Wanaparthy, Ranga Reddy district, village in Telangana, India
Nandi, village in Chikkaballapur district of Karnataka, India 
Arunachaleswara Temple, Nandi

Other 
Nāndi, an offering of food in Khoja ritual
Nandi (mythology), the white bull on which Lord Shiva rides
Nandi Awards, film awards given to Tollywood personalities and films
Nandi languages
Nandi people, an ethnic group from East Africa
Maha Nandi, 2005 Indian film

See also
 Nandi language (disambiguation)
 
 Naandi (disambiguation)
 Nandhi (disambiguation)
 Nandy (disambiguation)